Kundiman is Hale's fourth studio album released on July 27, 2009 Featuring The New Drummer Paolo Santiago, with singles "Bahay Kubo", "Kalesa", "Harinawa" and "Magkaibang Mundo".

The concept of Kundiman is Filipiniana as all songs of the album were written through cultural observation of the band's country of origin, and that the songs were also composed in humane context.

Reception

Track listing

References

2009 albums
Hale (band) albums